Utkal University of Culture is a Public university in Bhubaneswar, Odisha dedicated for research, teaching and education in the field of culture.

History
Utkal University of Culture established by an ordinance on 9 June 1999, which was later replaced by Utkal University of Culture Act 1999. It was established as a teaching-cum-affiliating university to engage itself to preserve, promote, propagate and protect the richness of Odisha's cultural values.

Academics
The university offers Postgraduate education, Master of Philosophy, and Doctor of Philosophy courses in following sections.

 Faculty of Culture Studies
 Faculty of Architecture and Archaeology
 Faculty of Language and Literature
 Faculty of Visual Arts
 Faculty of Performing Art
 Certificate Courses (Jaina & Tamil)

Affiliated Institutes
The university give affiliation to various Art and Craft, Hotel Management institutes in the state of Odisha. Some prominent institutes among them are Utkal Sangeet Mahavidyalaya, B.K. College of Art and Craft, Odissi Research Centre of Bhubaneswar and Govt. College of Art and Craft of Khallikote.

Accreditation 
It is accredited by the premier University Grants Commission (India). It has also been accredited by Association of Indian Universities.

References

External links
 Official website

Universities in Bhubaneswar
Odia culture
1999 establishments in Orissa
Educational institutions established in 1999